Wilber Elliott Wilder (August 18, 1857 – January 30, 1952) was a United States Army Brigadier General who was a recipient of the Medal of Honor for rescuing a wounded soldier under heavy fire.

Education and army career

Wilber Elliott Wilder graduated from West Point in June, 1877, when he was just short of 21 years old. In 1886, he was a key figure in negotiating the surrender of the Apache chief Geronimo. While an Army Captain, he served as acting superintendent of Yellowstone National Park from March 15, 1899 - June 22, 1899. He also served in the Spanish–American War, the Pancho Villa Expedition, and World War I. From 1913 to 1916, he was the commander of Fort Myer.

Personal life
He married Violet Blair Martin (1860-1919), of the prominent Throop-Martin family of "Willowbrook" near Auburn, New York, on April 16, 1884. Violet's brother Edward Sanford Martin (1856-1939) was a writer; her sister Emily (1846-1870) had married General Emory Upton. Wilber and Violet Wilder had a son, Wilber, and a daughter, Violet. After Violet's death, Wilder remarried in 1921 to widow Rose Dimond Phinney Grosvenor (1857-1923) and then to Laura Williams Merritt (1871-1951), widow of General Wesley Merritt. He outlived them both and, at the time of his death, was the oldest surviving graduate of the Academy. He died in Governors Island, New York but was residing in Ridgefield, Connecticut at the time.

His daughter Sylvia was the first wife of British diplomat Sir Alvary Gascoigne.

Medal of Honor citation
Rank and organization: First Lieutenant, 4th U.S. Cavalry. Place and date: At Horseshoe Canyon, N. Mex., 23 April 1882. Entered service at: Detroit, Mich. Birth: Atlas, Mich. Date of issue: 17 August 1896.

Citation:
Assisted, under a heavy fire, to rescue a wounded comrade.

References

External links

 Home of Heroes

1857 births
1952 deaths
United States Army Medal of Honor recipients
United States Military Academy alumni
American military personnel of the Spanish–American War
United States Army generals of World War I
People from Genesee County, Michigan
Military administration of Yellowstone National Park
American Indian Wars recipients of the Medal of Honor
Military personnel from Michigan
United States Army generals